The Music Bank Chart is a record chart on the South Korean KBS television music program Music Bank. Every week, the show awards the best-performing single on the chart in the country during its live broadcast.

In 2014, 32 singles achieved a number one on the chart and 28 music acts were awarded first-place trophies. Of all releases for the year Soyou & Junggigo's "Some" acquired the highest point total on the February 21 broadcast with a score of 11,011.

Chart history

References 

2014 in South Korean music
2015 record charts
Lists of number-one songs in South Korea